The following is the qualification system and qualified nations for the weightlifting at the 2023 Pan American Games which will be held in Santiago, Chile.

Qualification system
A total of 136 weightlifters (68 per gender) will qualify to compete at the games. A nation may enter a maximum of 8 weightlifters (four per gender). The host nation (Chile) automatically qualified the maximum team size. All other nations will qualify through their team scores from both the 2021 and 2022 Pan American Championships combined. A further two wild cards will be awarded (one per gender). Extra spots were granted to the winners of the respective categories at the 2021 Junior Pan American Games.

Qualification timeline

Qualification summary

2021 Junior Pan American Games

Men

Women

Men's rankings
The following is the list of nations winning quotas for men's events.
 Host nation: 4 Athletes
 Teams 1st–6th: 4 Athletes
 Teams 7th–12th: 3 Athletes
 Teams 13th–18th: 2 Athletes
 Teams 19th–22nd: 1 Athlete
 Wild card: 1 athlete

Women's rankings
The following is the list of nations winning quotas for women's events.
 Host nation: 4 Athletes
 Teams 1st–6th: 4 Athletes
 Teams 7th–12th: 3 Athletes
 Teams 13th–18th: 2 Athletes
 Teams 19th–22nd: 1 Athlete
 Wild card: 1 athlete

References

2021 in weightlifting
2022 in weightlifting
Qualification for the 2023 Pan American Games